JS Myōkō (DDG-175) is a  guided missile destroyer in the Japan Maritime Self-Defense Force (JMSDF). Myōkō was named after Mount Myōkō.

Operational history 
She was laid down by Mitsubishi Heavy Industries in Nagasaki, Nagasaki on 8 April 1993, launched on 5 October 1994; and commissioned on 14 March 1996.

In January 2008, it was announced that Lockheed Martin received a US$40.4 million contract modification to provide Aegis Ballistic Missile Defense System (BMD) capability to the Myōkō, the third   to be so equipped.

On 2 December 2019, Captain Miho Otani became the first woman to take the command of an MSDF Aegis destroyer with the JS Myōkō. The ceremony took place in the port city of Maizuru.

Gallery

References

External links
GlobalSecurity.org; JMSDF DDG Kongo Class

Kongō-class destroyers
1994 ships
Myōkō